Olympiaschanze was a ski jumping venue in St. Moritz, Switzerland, it was built in 1926 and closed in 2006. The ski jumping and the ski jumping part of the Nordic combined event for the 1928 Winter Olympics.

Its K-point was 66 m.

References
Henauer, Kurt (FIS PR and Media Coordinator Ski Jumping). "hill lengths." E-Mail to Chris Miller. 5 Jun 2006.
1928 Winter Olympics official report, part 1. p. 47. 
1928 Winter Olympics official report, part 2. pp. 10–1. 
1948 Winter Olympics official report. pp. 6, 21. 

Venues of the 1928 Winter Olympics
Venues of the 1948 Winter Olympics
Defunct sports venues in Switzerland
Ski jumping venues in Switzerland
Olympic Nordic combined venues
Olympic ski jumping venues
Sport in St. Moritz
Buildings and structures in Graubünden